Horacio de la Vega (born 3 June 1975) is a Mexican modern pentathlete. He competed at the 1996 Summer Olympics and the 2000 Summer Olympics.

Since November 2019 he is president of the Mexican Baseball League. 

Education 

In 1994 he studied International Business at Monterrey Institute of Technology and Higher Education (ITESM). Where he was offered an academic and sport scholarship. Years later, he enrolled into the MA in Sports Management at Claude Bernard University in Lyon, France. Recently gratuated, in 2006 he began his MBA at University of Texas in Austin, USA. 

Career history 

Once he completed his MBA, De la Vega was the Commercial Director and Secretary of the Government Board for the Pan/ Parapan American Games in Guadalajara. Which implied the management of about 2,000 people including staff, volunteers and service providers. In that time, he was in charge mainly of the private income for many events: commercial partners, sponsors, TV rights and media, ticketing, license products, retail stores, e-commerce, hospitality and F&B concessions. He also developed and implemented the marketing strategy of the games. De la Vega held that position until May 2012.  

After that, for six years in a row (2012-2018), De la Vega occupied the General Direction position at INDEPORTE in Mexico City. Broadly, in charge of managing the overall sports policy, aimed to improve the quality of life and wellbeing of its inhabitants. 

Particularly, he developed a wide strategy to promote and further sports through 4 main axes, in coordination with public and private sectors:

Social Sports: In collaboration with his team, he activated 4 million people per year through the implementation of 28 sports programs that promoted physical activation.
High Performance Sports: In this axis, he managed high performance training and competition venues, having 60% of the Mexican Olympic Teams training in Mexico City. Furthermore, the affiliation of Sport Associations was increased by him under law abiding regulations, enabling transparency and best practices of conventional and adapted sports.
Sporting Events: In which he attracted, negotiated, hosted and organized more than 35 international sporting events per year, that add up to the 450 sport events in the City, in collaboration with the most important international sport organizations and leagues generating an economic impact of 250 million USD per year, positioning Mexico City as a global Sports Capital. Some of the most representatives events were: a) Formula 1 Mexico Grand Prix, returning after 23 years of absence with a 5-year contract; b) NFL Season Games, for the first time in Mexico consolidating the American football fanbase in the country with a 3-year contract; c) Yearly regular season events from: NBA, MLB, UFC, PGA, and LPGA and d) World Championships and World Class events from: FIFA, FIA, FIBA, FIVB, WTF, WA, UIPM, IPC and other international federations. Moreover, De la Vega was positioned as the President of the Telcel Mexico City Marathon, creating and implementing a 360 strategy that transformed the event, starting with 6,000 runners and growing to 40,000 in four years. Currently ranked number 9 in the world according to the Association of International Marathons and Distance Races (AIMS). 
Sports Infrastructure: About this axis, he recovered the "Sport City Complex", a 292-hectare facility dedicated to sport, negotiating public and private investment of 215 million USD for the development of first world venues for different sports, becoming the largest sports complex in Latin America. On the other hand, he led the negotiations for the Autodromo Hermanos Rodriguez (racetrack) and the Diablos Rojos Baseball Stadium, two of the largest sport infrastructure projects with private investment in public spaces. Finally, he got involved in the negotiations to build the Cruz Azul soccer stadium, one of the three local teams, with an investment of 150 million USD.

References

1975 births
Living people
Mexican male modern pentathletes
Olympic modern pentathletes of Mexico
Modern pentathletes at the 1996 Summer Olympics
Modern pentathletes at the 2000 Summer Olympics
People from Temixco